Elections to Liverpool City Council were held on Friday 1 November 1889. One third of the council seats were up for election, the term of office of each councillor being three years.

Four of the sixteen seats were uncontested.

After the election, the composition of the council was:

Election result

Ward results

* - Retiring Councillor seeking re-election

Abercromby

Castle Street

Everton

Exchange

Great George

Lime Street

North Toxteth

Pitt Street

Rodney Street

St. Anne Street

St. Paul's

St. Peter's

Scotland

South Toxteth

Vauxhall

West Derby

Aldermanic Election
At the meeting of the Council on 9 November 1892, the terms of office 
of eight alderman expired.

The following eight were elected as Aldermen by the Council (Aldermen and Councillors) on 9 November 1889 for a term of six years.

* - re-elected aldermen.

By-elections

No. 15, South Toxteth, Tuesday 26 November 1889

Caused by the election of William Radcliffe (Conservative, South Toxteth, 
elected 1 November 1888) being elected as an alderman on 9 November 1889

No. 14, West Derby, Tuesday 17 December 1889

Following the resignation of Sir Andrew Barclay Walker as an alderman

, Councillor William John Lunt (Conservative, West Derby, elected 1 November 1887)
 
was elected as an Alderman by the Council on 4 December 1889
.

No. 12, Lime Street, Tuesday 25 February 1890

The resignation of Alderman Sir David Radcliffe was reported to the Council on 8 January 1890
.

Councillor Thomas William Oakshott (Conservative. Lime Street, elected 1 November 
1887)

, was elected as an Alderman by the Council on 5 February 1890
.

No. 3, Vauxhall, Friday 23 May 1890

The death, on 5 May 1890, of Councillor Patrick Byrne (Irish Home Rule, Vauxhall, 
elected 1 November 1887) 
 was reported to the Council on 7 May 1890
.

See also

 Liverpool City Council
 Liverpool Town Council elections 1835 - 1879
 Liverpool City Council elections 1880–present
 Mayors and Lord Mayors of Liverpool 1207 to present
 History of local government in England

References

1889
Liverpool
December 1889 events
1880s in Liverpool